Michael Szilágyi de Horogszeg  (c. 1400 – 1460) was a Hungarian general who was Regent of Hungary, Count  of Beszterce and Head of Szilágyi–Hunyadi Liga.

Family
He was born in the early 15th century as vice-ispán of Bács County, son of the captain of Srebrenik, Ladislaus Szilágyi and Catherine Bellyéni. The common noble family derived its name of Horogszegi from its estate in the county of Temes. His sister, Elisabeth, was John Hunyadi's wife. Miguel Szilágyi married Margarita Báthory around 1440 (marriage from which it is known that several children were born, but none reached adulthood). Another sister of Miguel, Sofía Szilágyi married Juan Geréb, Voivode of Transylvania, who were the parents of the influential future Bishop and Archbishop Ladislaus Geréb.

Life
Michael Szilágyi began his career in his brother-in-law's service as vice-ispán (vicecomes) of Torontál County. He was the captain of the Belgrade fortress at the Ottoman siege in 1456. As Ban of Macsó, he acquired a place among the barons He is commemorated in the Serbian epic poetry as Mihajlo Svilojević or sometimes "crni ban Mihail", while Ottoman chronicles referred to him as "Kara Mihal.

On 20 January 1458, Matthias Corvinus was elected king by the Parliament. This was the first time in the medieval Hungarian kingdom that a member of the nobility, without dynastic ancestry and relationship, mounted the royal throne. Such an election upset the usual course of dynastic succession in the age. In the Czech and Hungarian states they heralded a new judiciary era in Europe, characterized by the absolute supremacy of the Parliament (dietal system) and a tendency to centralization. During his reign, Matthias reduced the power of the feudal lords, and ruled instead with a cadre of talented and highly educated individuals, chosen for their abilities rather than their social status. The Diet appointed Michael Szilágyi, the new king's uncle as regent, because of Matthias' young age. Throughout 1458 the struggle between the young king and the magnates, reinforced by Matthias's own uncle and guardian Szilágyi, was acute. But Matthias, who began by deposing Garai and dismissing Szilágyi, and then proceeded to levy a tax, without the consent of the Diet, in order to hire mercenaries, easily prevailed.

Michael Szilágyi resigned the office of regent in August 1459 and was killed by the Ottomans after being captured by Ali Bey Mihaloğlu during the battle near Baziaş in 1460. Since he was considered a spy, he was tortured and sawed in half.

Death 
Still in that same year in Serbia, Szilágyi collided again on the battlefield against the Turkish commander Ali, between the places of Szendrő and Posasin. His small army however was soon surrounded by the Ottomans, and after a long fight, all including Szilágyi were captured by the Turks. Szilágyi was taken to Constantinople, where he was beheaded on the sultan's orders for not wanting to reveal the weak points of the Belgrade fortress.

Ancestry

In popular culture 
In Bandai Namco's video game Ace Combat 7: Skies Unknown, the antagonist, Mihaly A. Shilage, is likely named after him

Sources
Fraknói Vilmos: Michael Szilágyi, The uncle of King Matthias (Bp., 1913)

 Kisfaludy Károly: Szilágyi Mihály szabadulása (színmű, Pest, 1822)
 Vörösmarty Mihály: Szilágyi Mihály a világosi várban (vers, 1822 – 1823).

References

Michael
Hungarian generals
Hungarian nobility
Bans of Macsó
15th-century Hungarian people
15th-century executions by the Ottoman Empire
Hungarian people executed abroad
Executed spies
People executed by cutting in half
Year of birth unknown
Medieval spies
1460 deaths